Mount Binālud (In Persian: بینالود) is the second highest peak in Razavi Khorasan province, Iran. It is known also as  the Roof of Khorasan. Made of Triassic-Jurassic metamorphic rocks, this mountain is 26 km north-east of Nishapur and to the west of Mashhad. With an elevation of 3201 metres, Mount Binalud is the second highest point of the Binalud Mountains.

External links

Introduction - Drainage Basins - Dasht-e Kavir

Mountains of Razavi Khorasan Province
Nishapur
Binalud
Landforms of Razavi Khorasan Province
Mountains of Iran